"5-10-15 Hours" is a rhythm-and-blues song written by Rudy Toombs in 1952 for Ruth Brown and was one of several number-one R&B hits he wrote for her.  When Brown was inducted into the Rock and Roll Hall of Fame, her induction  said that "her best work was to be found on such red-hot mid-Fifties R&B sides as '5-10-15 Hours'".

Song Background
Her recording is smooth, sophisticated blues shouting at its  best, has a touch of suppliance more characteristic of the vocal qualities of popular singers than of the blues. The recording features a tenor sax solo by Willis Jackson.

Footnotes

1952 singles
Ruth Brown songs
Songs written by Rudy Toombs
1952 songs